Edward A. Purcell Jr. (born Kansas City, Missouri) is an American historian.

Life
Purcell grew up in Kansas City, Missouri. He attended Rockhurst College, where he received a B.A. in 1962, then went on to the University of Kansas, earning an M.A. in American history in 1964.  He received a Ph.D. in 1968 from the University of Wisconsin, then taught at the University of California, Berkeley and at Wellesley College before attending Harvard Law School, where he received a J.D. in 1979.  He is the Joseph Solomon Distinguished Professor at New York Law School.

His work has appeared in Virginia Law Review, The University of Pennsylvania Law Review, UCLA Law Review, American Historical Review, the Journal of American History, and the American Quarterly.

Awards
 2013 Outstanding Scholar Award from the Fellows of the American Bar Foundation
 Charles Warren Fellow in American Legal History at Harvard Law School
 1972 Frederick Jackson Turner Award
 American Bar Association Silver Gavel Certificate of Merit
 Supreme Court Historical Society’s Triennial Griswold Prize
 Association of American Law Schools’ Coif Triennial Book Award

Works
 
 
 
 
 
 Progressive Lawyering, Globalization and Markets: Rethinking Ideology and Strategy (William S. Hein & Co., 2007)
 Private Law and Social Inequality in the Industrial Age: Comparing Legal Cultures in Britain, France, Germany, and the United States (Oxford University Press, 2000)

References

21st-century American historians
21st-century American male writers
1941 births
Living people
Rockhurst University alumni
University of Kansas alumni
University of Wisconsin–Madison alumni
University of California, Berkeley faculty
Wellesley College faculty
Harvard Law School alumni
New York Law School faculty
Historians from California
American male non-fiction writers